Robert Neelly Bellah (February 23, 1927 – July 30, 2013) was an American sociologist and the Elliott Professor of Sociology at the University of California, Berkeley. He was internationally known for his work related to the sociology of religion.

Education
Bellah graduated summa cum laude from Harvard College in 1950, receiving a Bachelor of Arts degree in social relations with a concentration in social anthropology. His undergraduate honors thesis won the Phi Beta Kappa Prize and was later published in 1952 with the title Apache Kinship Systems.

Bellah graduated from Harvard in a joint sociology and Far East languages program. Bellah first encountered the work of Talcott Parsons as an undergraduate when his senior honors thesis advisor was David Aberle, a former student of Parsons. Parsons was specially interested in Bellah's concept of religious evolution and the concept of "civil religion". He received his Doctor of Philosophy degree in 1955. His doctoral dissertation was titled Religion and Society in Tokugawa Japan and was an extension of Max Weber's Protestant ethic thesis to Japan. It was published as Tokugawa Religion in 1957.

While an undergraduate at Harvard, Bellah was a member of the Communist Party USA from 1947 to 1949 and a chairman of the John Reed Club, "a recognized student organization concerned with the study of Marxism". During the summer of 1954, Dean of the Faculty of Arts and Sciences at Harvard McGeorge Bundy, who later served as a national security adviser to John F. Kennedy and Lyndon B. Johnson, threatened to withdraw Bellah's graduate student fellowship if he did not provide the names of his former club associates. Bellah was also interrogated by the Boston office of the Federal Bureau of Investigation with the same purpose. As a result, Bellah and his family spent two years in Canada, where he was awarded a post-doctoral fellowship at the Islamic Institute in McGill University in Montreal. He returned to Harvard after McCarthyism declined due to the death of its main instigator senator Joseph McCarthy. Bellah afterwards wrote,

Career
Bellah's magnum opus, Religion in Human Evolution (2011), traces the biological and cultural origins of religion and the interplay between the two. The sociologist and philosopher Jürgen Habermas wrote of the work: "This great book is the intellectual harvest of the rich academic life of a leading social theorist who has assimilated a vast range of biological, anthropological, and historical literature in the pursuit of a breathtaking project ... In this field I do not know of an equally ambitious and comprehensive study." The book won the Distinguished Book Award of the American Sociological Association's Section on Sociology of Religion.

Bellah is best known for his 1985 book Habits of the Heart, which discusses how religion contributes to and detracts from America's common good, and for his studies of religious and moral issues and their connection to society. Bellah was perhaps best known for his work related to American civil religion, a term which he coined in a 1967 article that has since gained widespread attention among scholars.

He served in various positions at Harvard from 1955 to 1967 when he took the position of Ford Professor of Sociology at the University of California at Berkeley. He spent the remainder of his career at Berkeley. His views are often classified as communitarian. A full biography of Robert Bellah, "the world's most widely read sociologist of religion", written by sociologist Matteo Bortolini,  titled A Joyfully Serious Man. The Life of Robert Bellah, has been published by Princeton University Press in the fall of 2021.

Nomination at Princeton
In 1972 Carl Kaysen and Clifford Geertz nominated Robert Bellah as a candidate for a permanent faculty position at the Institute for Advanced Study (IAS). (Bellah was at the IAS as a temporary member for the academic year 1972–1973.) On January 15, 1973, at an IAS faculty meeting, the IAS faculty voted against Bellah by thirteen to eight with three abstentions. All of the mathematicians and half of the historians voted against the nomination. All of the physicists voted in favor of the nomination. After the vote, Kaysen said that he intended to recommend Bellah's nomination to the IAS's trustees despite the vote. The faculty members who voted against Bellah were outraged. The dispute became extremely acrimonious, but in April 1973 Bellah's eldest daughter died and he, in grief, withdrew from consideration.

Personal life
Bellah was born in Altus, Oklahoma, on February 23, 1927. His father was a newspaper editor and publisher who committed suicide when Bellah was three years old. His mother Lillian moved the family to Los Angeles, where she had relatives. Bellah grew up in Los Angeles and attended Los Angeles High School, where he and his future wife, Melanie Hyman, were editors of the student newspaper. They got married in 1948 after she graduated from Stanford University, and he began studying at Harvard University after serving in the US Army. Bellah's wife died in 2010.

Bellah was briefly a communist during his student years at Harvard, as he recalled in 1977 in a letter to the New York Review of Books regarding McCarthyism at the university:

Harvard's capitulation to McCarthyism is still being defended as a form of resistance to McCarthyism. An account of my experiences will, I believe, support [Sigmund] Diamond's and not [McGeorge] Bundy's interpretation of those years.
I was a member of the Communist Party as a Harvard undergraduate from 1947 to 1949. During that period I was mainly involved in the John Reed Club, a recognized student organization concerned with the study of Marxism. In that connection, I might recount an incident that indicates that a difference between a public policy and a privacy policy at Harvard such as Diamond has suggested may already have begun in 1949. According to [Seymour Martin] Lipset:

In 1949, the John Reed Club sponsored a talk by a well-known Communist, Gerhart Eisler, who was on his way to a job in East Germany after having been convicted for contempt of Congress. When the University was attacked for allowing students to be corrupted, Wilbur Bender, then Dean of Harvard College, defended the students' right to hear, stating: "If Harvard students can be corrupted by an Eisler, Harvard College had better shut down as an educational institution ... [p. 182]"

I was, I believe, Chairman of the John Reed Club at the time and was informed shortly after we announced that Eisler would speak that the university was considering forbidding the meeting and that the chairman and executive committee of the Club were asked to meet with an administrative officer. The administrator told us in the strongest terms that the invitation was extremely embarrassing for Harvard and asked us for the good of the school to withdraw the invitation. When we stood fast he told us that quite probably none of us would ever get jobs if we persisted in our course of action. The Harvard administration was attempting to do privately and indirectly what it would not do publicly and brazenly, namely suppress freedom of speech, which was precisely the aim of [Joseph] McCarthy.

Bellah was fluent in Japanese and literate in Chinese, French, and German, and later studied Arabic at McGill University in Montreal.

Bellah died July 30, 2013, at an Oakland, California, hospital from complications after heart surgery. He was 86 and is survived by his daughters Jennifer Bellah Maguire and Hally Bellah-Guther; a sister, Hallie Reynolds; and five grandchildren. Robert and Melanie Bellah's eldest daughter committed suicide in 1973. Their third daughter died at age 17 in 1976 in an automobile accident. Raised as a Presbyterian, he converted to Episcopalianism in the Anglo-Catholic tradition.

Works
Robert Bellah is the author, editor, co-author, or co-editor of the following books:
 Tokugawa Religion: The Values of Pre-Industrial Japan (1957)
 Religion and Progress in Modern Asia (1965)
 Beyond Belief: Essays on Religion in a Post-Traditional World (1970)
 Emile Durkheim on Morality and Society (1973)
 The Broken Covenant: American Civil Religion in Time of Trial (1975)
 The New Religious Consciousness (1976)
 Varieties of Civil Religion (1980)
 Habits of the Heart: Individualism and Commitment in American Life (1985)
 Uncivil Religion: Interreligious Hostility in America (1987)
 The Good Society (1991)
 Imagining Japan: The Japanese Tradition and Its Modern Interpretation (2003)
 The Robert Bellah Reader (2006)
 Religion in Human Evolution: From the Paleolithic to the Axial Age (2011)
 The Axial Age and Its Consequences (2012)

Awards and honors
Bellah was elected a Fellow of the American Academy of Arts and Sciences in 1967. In 1996, he was elected to the American Philosophical Society. He received the National Humanities Medal in 2000 from President Bill Clinton, in part for "his efforts to illuminate the importance of community in American society." In 2007, he received the American Academy of Religion Martin E. Marty Award for the Public Understanding of Religion. In 2008, he received the honorary doctorate of the Max Weber Centre of the University of Erfurt.

See also

 American exceptionalism
 Lifestyle enclave
 Political religion
 Sheilaism

References

Footnotes

Bibliography

Further reading

External links

 Robert Bellah's website
 Bill Moyers interview with Robert Bellah on PBS, September 27, 1988
 The Immanent Frame, a SSRC blog with posts by Robert Bellah
 

1927 births
2013 deaths
20th-century American Episcopalians
20th-century scholars
21st-century American Episcopalians
21st-century scholars
Academics from Oklahoma
American Anglo-Catholics
American sociologists
Anglo-Catholic writers
Christians from California
Christians from Oklahoma
Communitarianism
Converts to Anglicanism from Presbyterianism
Fellows of the American Academy of Arts and Sciences
Former Presbyterians
Harvard College alumni
National Humanities Medal recipients
Sociologists of religion
Sociology of culture
University of California, Berkeley College of Letters and Science faculty
Writers from Los Angeles
McGill University Institute of Islamic Studies alumni
Members of the American Philosophical Society